Rachmat Affandi (born April 5, 1984) is an Indonesian former professional footballer who plays as a striker.

Career 
On December 12, 2014, he moved to Mitra Kukar.

Honours

Club 
Arema Indonesia
Winner
 Indonesia Super League: 2009–10

Country 
Indonesia U-21
Winner
 Hassanal Bolkiah Trophy: 2002

References

External links 
 

Indonesian footballers
Living people
1984 births
Sportspeople from Jakarta
Persija Jakarta players
Persebaya Surabaya players
Pelita Jaya FC players
Persibom Bolaang Mongondow players
Persikabo Bogor players
PSMS Medan players
Arema F.C. players
Persib Bandung players
Mitra Kukar players
Indonesian Premier Division players
Liga 1 (Indonesia) players
Association football forwards